Reginaldo de Santana (born 22 July 1975), commonly known as Marilia, is a Brazilian former professional footballer who played as a centre-back.

Club career
Marillia made his debut in Dutch professional football on 24 August 1996 for Sparta Rotterdam in a game against NAC Breda. He signed a six-month contract with Sport Club Ulbra in January 2007. on August 16, 2007, he left for SER Caxias do Sul.

In December 2008, he signed a one-year contract with Criciúma. In January 2009, he left for Veranópolis and in July for Concórdia.

References
Marilia on Ronald Zwiers
VI Profile
Profile
 Brazilian FA Database

Living people
1975 births
Brazilian footballers
Brazilian expatriate footballers
Association football defenders
Sparta Rotterdam players
VVV-Venlo players
Criciúma Esporte Clube players
Eredivisie players
Eerste Divisie players
Expatriate footballers in the Netherlands
Brazilian expatriate sportspeople in the Netherlands
People from Umuarama
Sportspeople from Paraná (state)